Zeller Glacier is a glacier about 10 miles (16 km) long, flowing west-northwest to enter the south side of Byrd Glacier just north of Mount Fries. Named by the Advisory Committee on Antarctic Names (US-ACAN) for Edward J. Zeller, geologist at McMurdo Station, 1959–60 and 1960-61 seasons.

Glaciers of Oates Land